Bremond is a city in Robertson County, Texas, United States.

Bremond or Brémond may also refer to:
 Antonin Brémond (1692–1755), Master of the Order of Preachers 1748–1755
 Édouard Brémond (1868–1948), French Army officer
 Henri Brémond (1865–1933), French literary scholar, sometime Jesuit, and Catholic philosopher
 Iryna Brémond (born 1984), Belarusian-French tennis player
 Jean-François Brémond (1807–1868), French painter
 Karine Brémond (born 1975), French swimmer
 Paul Bremond (1810–1885), American businessman
 Séverine Beltrame (born 1979, married name Brémond 2005–2008), French tennis player

See also
 Bremond Block Historic District (Austin, Texas)
 Bremond Independent School District, Bremond, Texas
 

Surnames of French origin